John B. Alexander High School is a secondary school in Laredo, Texas, United States and a part of the United Independent School District.

The mascot for Alexander High School is a Bulldog. The high school was established in 1994 to alleviate overcrowding at United High School in northern sector of Laredo. Freshman students are housed in a separate building at 4601 Victory Drive.

Magnet school
John B. Alexander High School also houses John B. Alexander High School Health Science Magnet School, a magnet school that focuses on health science education.

Notable alumni

Kaleb Canales, Class of 1996, assistant coach of the Dallas Mavericks of the National Basketball Association

Roxanne Perez, Class of 2020, Professional Wrestler, WWE

References

External links
 

Alexander
United Independent School District high schools
Magnet schools in Texas